Benjamin Furly (13 April 1636 – March 1714) was an English Quaker merchant and friend of John Locke.

Life
Furly was born at Colchester 13 April 1636, began life as a merchant there, and joined the early Quakers. In 1659–60 he assisted John Stubbs in the compilation of the 'Battle-Door.' George Fox records that this work was finished in 1661, and that Furly took great pains with it.

Some time previous to 1677 he went to live at Rotterdam, where he set up as a merchant in the Scheepmaker's Haven. In 1677 George Fox stayed and held religious meetings at Furly's house in Rotterdam, and Furly then accompanied Fox, Keith, and others through Holland and Germany, acting as an interpreter. Later on in the same year he made a ministerial journey with William Penn. His house became the rendezvous of Jean Leclerc, Philip van Limborch, and other scholars, and there he entertained Algernon Sydney, Locke (1686–88), and Locke's pupil, Anthony Ashley Cooper, 3rd Earl of Shaftesbury (1688–89). Sydney constantly wrote to him from 1677 to 1679. Edward Clarke of Chipley seems to have introduced Locke to him, and their correspondence lasted as long as Locke lived. Locke delighted in playing with Furly's children.

Subsequently Furly renounced quakerism, again embraced it, but is supposed finally to have left it. He died at Rotterdam in March 1714.

Works
Furly's works include:

 'A Battle-Door for Teachers and Professors to learn Singular and Plural,' &c. (in thirty-five languages), with Stubbs and Fox, 1660.
 Preface to Ames's 'Die Sache Christi und seines Volks,' 1662.
 'The World's Honour detected, and, for the Unprofitableness thereof, rejected,' &c., 1663.

He also wrote a number of prefaces to the works of other men, assisted George Keith in writing 'The Universal Free Grace of the Gospel asserted,' and translated several works into English from the Dutch.

Furly's library was sold by auction, and a catalogue, 'Bibliotheca Furleiana,' was published (1714).

Family
He was twice married. On the death of his first wife in 1691, Locke sent a letter of condolence. By her he had four sons, Benjamin, Benjohan (b. 1681), John, and Arent. The two eldest were merchants. The youngest was secretary to the Earl of Peterborough in Spain, and died there in 1705. Benjohan's daughter, Dorothy, married Thomas Forster, whose sons were Benjamin Forster and Edward Forster. Edward's grandson, Thomas Ignatius Maria Forster, inherited much of Furly's correspondence, and printed part of his collection as 'Original Letters of Locke, Shaftesbury, and Sydney' in 1830, reissuing it in his privately printed 'Epistolarium' in 1830, 2nd edit. 1847. Much of Shaftesbury's correspondence with Furly went to the Public Record Office.

References

1636 births
1714 deaths
17th-century merchants
Converts to Quakerism
English merchants
English Quakers
People from Colchester